Idle Champions of the Forgotten Realms is a 2018 incremental game based on Dungeons & Dragons for Android, iOS, PlayStation 4, Xbox One, macOS, Microsoft Windows, and Nintendo Switch.

Gameplay 
The player confronts waves of enemies by clicking on them or managing a formation of unique champions with individual abilities. Each enemy drops currency that can be spent to unlock new champions or upgrade existing ones to strengthen the formation. Equipment can drop as loot, and be attached to specific champions to further enhance their abilities. The game also revisits settings and storylines based on published adventures like Curse of Strahd and Tomb of Annihilation.

Development 
The game is developed by Codename Entertainment, whose previous incremental game Crusaders of the Lost Idols garnered popularity and served as a basis for this game. On September 7, 2017, the game entered early access on Steam. The game was released for iPad and tablets via Android on May 17, 2018. In 2018, the game released for the PlayStation 4 on December 11. The game was released for Xbox One in North America on December 14, 2018, and in Europe on August 2, 2019. On March 25, 2020, it was fully released on Steam via Windows and macOS. On May 7, 2020, it released for the Nintendo Switch on the eShop.

The developers continue to add new unlockable champions to the game, some of which are based on characters from D&D novels, or actual player characters from D&D web series, such as Dice, Camera, Action and Critical Role.

References 

Windows games
Xbox One games
PlayStation 4 games
Nintendo Switch games
Incremental games
Dungeons & Dragons